International Labor Rights Forum v Firestone Tire and Rubber Co (2005) was a class-action lawsuit filed by The International Labor Rights Forum on November 17, 2005, against the Firestone Tire and Rubber Company, on behalf of a group of former child laborers, in Liberia.

The plaintiffs accused the company of knowingly allowing the use of child laborers filing a suit as a result of policies which began when Firestone opened its first plant in Liberia in 1926.

Firestone contends the 1926 agreement as a milestone advancement in the global production of rubber.

See also
Economy of Liberia
Liberia (on 1926 rubber agreement)
Firestone Tire and Rubber Company#Firestone's corporate troubles

External links
ILRF site for this suit
International Rights Advocates site for this suit
Stop Firestone campaign website

Law of Liberia
Trade unions in Liberia
Child labour
2005 in Liberia
Labour case law
Bridgestone
2005 in case law